Boxen is a box set that was released on 1998 by the punk band Ebba Grön. It contains four CDs and booklet with the story of the band. The first three discs are extended versions of their three studio albums, We're Only In It For The Drugs, Kärlek & Uppror, and Ebba Grön. The fourth disc is an extended version of their live album that also was released in 1998, Ebba Grön Live. Some songs from the latter album have been omitted, e.g. "Die Mauer," while others have been added, e.g. "Beväpna Er."

For their 30-year anniversary in 2008 the box set was released again with a new design and a bonus DVD, Ebba the Movie.

Track listing

CD1 (We're Only In It For The Drugs)

CD2 (Kärlek & Uppror)

CD3 (Ebba Grön)

CD4 (Live)

2008 compilation albums
Ebba Grön albums